EAS Airlines Flight 4226 was a scheduled domestic passenger flight from Kano to Lagos, Nigeria. In addition, at least 30 civilians on the ground were killed. With a total of 103 fatalities, Flight 4226 is the deadliest aviation accident involving a BAC One-Eleven.

Nigerian Accident Investigation and Prevention Bureau attributed the disaster to pilot error. The aircraft overran the runway and rolled for few hundred meters, creating huge burst of dust which was eventually ingested by the engines. This limited the ability of the engines to deliver power and caused the aircraft to lose speed. The extended landing gear aggravated the condition and the aircraft eventually crashed due to the compromised airspeed. Due to the absence of usable flight recorders, the reasons for the crew to accidentally overrun the runway could not be determined.

Aircraft
The aircraft involved in the crash was a BAC One-Eleven 525FT with a registration 5N-ESF. The aircraft was manufactured in 1980 and was first delivered to TAROM with a Romanian registration of YR-BCN. It was later acquired by Inex-Adria Aviopromet and Ryanair through lease before it was returned to TAROM in 1989. In July 2001, the aircraft was acquired by EAS Airlines and the aircraft entered the fleet later in August. By the time of the crash, the aircraft had accumulated a total of 24,644 flight hours.

Two Rolls-Royce Spey turbofan engines powered the aircraft. The left engine was installed in 2000 while the right engine was installed recently in May 2, transferred from the aircraft's sister ship 5N-ESD. The last major maintenance check was conducted in January 2001.

Passengers and crews
Flight 4226 was carrying 69 passengers and 8 crew members, contrary to initial reports which claimed that the aircraft was carrying 105 passengers. Most of the passengers were Nigerian, with one Lebanese confirmed to be on board Flight 4226. BBC News stated that at least one British passenger was on the flight. Nigeria's Daily Trust reported that three French nationals were among those on board. A total of 23 passengers boarded the aircraft in Kano for Lagos, while 47 Lagos-bound passengers had boarded the aircraft in Jos, the aircraft's previous destination.

Among the passengers was Nigeria's Sport Minister Ishaya Mark Aku. He was on his way to attend the 2002 FIFA World Cup warm-up match between Nigeria and Kenya. Julie Useni and Danjuma Useni, the wife and son of former Minister of Federal Capital Territory Jeremiah Useni, were also onboard.

The commander of the flight was 49-year-old Captain Peter Abayomi Inneh with a flight hours of more than 14,000 hours, of which 7,000 hours were on the type. He joined EAS Airlines in 2000 and had been flying the BAC One-Eleven ever since. The co-pilot was 47-year-old First Officer Chris Adewole Adegboye. He had accrued a total of more than 8,000 flight hours, of which 3,350 hours were on the type. The flight engineers were Emmanuel Idoko and Muhammad Sarki.

Accident
Flight 4226 was a flight from Mallam Aminu Kano International Airport in the north of the country to Lagos Murtala Muhammed International Airport in the southwest. Before the flight to Lagos, the aircraft had flown to Jos in nearby Plateau State. When it arrived in Kano, a total of 36 disembarked in Kano and 47 people boarded the aircraft. The flight was expected to take-off at around 13:30 p.m with Captain Peter Inneh and First Officer Chris Adegboye as the pilots. The aircraft was carrying 69 passengers and 8 crew members.

The crew requested start-up clearance at 13:19 p.m and the aircraft started to move towards the taxiway. At 12:26 p.m, the aircraft was lined-up with the runway. Captain Peter jokingly stated: "FL280 for EXW4226, ready for space travel" and the ATC cleared them for take-off from Kano's Runway 23 and gave the crew a brief information regarding the temperature and the weather ahead. After the ATC had completed the report, the crew commenced the take-off roll.

Crash
During the roll, the controller at the tower noticed that the aircraft was moving sluggishly, pacing much slower than usual. When it passed through the runway threshold, the nose had been in upward position, but the landing gears still had not lifted off the ground. The aircraft ended up overrunning the runway end and struck two runway lights. As it overran the runway, burst of dust could be seen from the control tower. It then lifted off outside the runway, but before it could fully lift off the ground the landing gears struck a ground depression, causing a violent impact that rattled the entire aircraft. The impact caused some parts of the ceilings to come down onto the floor. Following the impact, the aircraft was covered in massive burst of dust.

Even though the aircraft had successfully taken off from the runway, its airspeed began to drop and the crew was faced with an impending stall condition. Flight 4226 then began to swerve from side to side. Captain Peter reported to the control tower that he was having an engine failure. He could be heard saying "My take-off is difficult, I heard a sound on my right engine. The aircraft is wobbling. I think I'm in a difficult situation." The crew tried to avoid stalling the aircraft and decided to lower the nose, but their altitude was too low with houses could be seen from the cabin 'just mere meters from the aircraft'. Passengers inside the aircraft were panicking and screaming.

People on the ground who witnessed the aircraft coming towards them then scrambled to safety. The aircraft could not gain more altitude and failed to avoid obstacles. It then clipped a minaret of a mosque and then struck numerous houses and a local Islamic school on the ground. The aircraft then flew onto another mosque at full-force and burst into flames. Praying services were held at the local mosques and at least 100 students were in the school complex at the time of the crash.  Many buildings collapsed, including the school and mosque.

Immediate aftermath
Dozens of students, worshippers and local residents were trapped inside the rubble. Eyewitnesses stated that people on the ground began to wail and scream, rushing to the crash site to search for their relatives trapped inside the rubble. According to eyewitness, they heard several calls for help from inside the aircraft. Meanwhile, flames began to quickly spread across the neighborhood. Firefighters reached the crash site within 10 minutes after the accident, but due to the large amount of onlookers and volunteers they couldn't swiftly conduct the rescue operation. The absence of water sources at the crash site and the hostile behaviour from the crowd towards the crew further worsened the situation. They rapidly rad out of water and foam and had to return to the airport to refill their supplies. Eventually, some of the victims who were trapped couldn't be saved from the blaze. The fire quickly spread, burning the trapped victims.

Three survivors were evacuated from the crash site and were immediately transported to the nearby hospitals in serious condition. The Lebanese passenger immediately got out of the aircraft's exit door and met with another survivor, who was found lying under a shed. The Lebanese was relatively unharmed, while the other survivor was seriously injured. They both managed to climb up the ruins of a house where they were located at and decided to jump to the roof of a house next door. Both were later taken to a nearby hospital by two local residents.

Due to the chaotic situation, soldiers and police officers were deployed to the area. Authorities stated that the local mortuaries had been filled to capacity due to the numbers of the dead and as a result corpses were piled on the floor. Some of the bodies were transported to the Aminu Kano Teaching Hospital. Off-duty emergency workers were called to work in response to the crisis of the disaster.

Casualties
In the aftermath of the crash, 103 people were killed, including 66 passengers and 7 crew members. The exact number of people who were killed on the ground could not be determined, but the death toll listed more than 30 victims. More than 10 children reportedly perished in the accident. The corpses of the victims were transported to various hospitals in Kano. The Medical Centre of Nigerian Armed Forces reported that they had received 22 bodies, while the city's Murtalla Mohammed General Hospital received 61 bodies. The other 23 were distributed throughout several private hospitals in Kano. Most of the bodies were badly charred.

One cabin crew member and 3 passengers survived the crash. There were initially five survivors but one of them eventually succumbed to their injuries. Of the 4 survivors, one survived with no injuries, one with minor injuries while the others were in serious condition. Two survivors had to be sent abroad for treatment due to the severity of their injuries, with one receiving treatment in Cologne. Majority of the survivors were seated at the aft or near the aft of the aircraft.

An additional 47 people on the ground were injured in the accident. Of the 47, a total of 24 people were badly injured and the other 23 suffered mild injuries.

Rescue workers stated that at least 30 homes had been destroyed in the crash. Nigerian Red Cross added that hundreds had been made homeless.

Response
Due to the accident, Nigerian President Olusegun Obasanjo cut short his visit to states in Southern Africa and immediately returned to Abuja to observe the situation. He expressed his sympathy to the victims and stated that two days of national mourning would be held in Nigeria. All Nigerian flags would be flown at half mast throughout the country. He ordered an immediate inquiry into the accident and further added that foreign experts would be invited if necessary.

The Emir of Kano, Ado Bayero, along with Governor of Kano State Rabiu Kwankwaso, visited the crash site. The Emir and the Governor later expressed their sympathy to the relatives of the victims. Vice President Atiku Abubakar visited the crash site on May 4, but during his speech angry locals pelted his convoy with stones, prompting the police to fire tear gas onto the crowd. President Obasanjo also visited the crash site on May 6. His visit, however, was also met with fury as families of the victims accused him of "being insensitive". He reportedly visited the crash without prior announcement, under tight security, and avoided taking questions from the public.

President Obasanjo pledged a total of $86,000 federal funds to the victims of the crash, further stating that destroyed houses would be  rebuilt. Spokesperson for Kano Government stated that the government of Kano would do "anything possible to alleviate their suffering". A relief committee consisted of 21 members was set up by Kano State. The committee would be in charge of collection and distribution of aids to the victims and would be headed by the deputy governor of Kano. Donations of up to 24 million Naira reportedly had been collected from the country.

Following the death of Ishaya Mark Aku, the Nigerian Government appointed Nigerian Minister of Police Affairs Stephen Akiga as his successor. In response to the death of Ishaya Mark Aku, Nigeria Football Association cancelled the upcoming football friendly match between Nigeria and China.

A total of 56 bodies could not be identified due to their severe condition, most were burnt beyond recognition. Kano government eventually held a mass burial for the unidentified victims. The bodies were carried by six trucks and hundreds of mourners attended the funeral service. Prior to the burial, a prayer service had been held in Gidan Rumfa, the Palace of Emir of Kano.

In response to the crash, Nigerian Minister of Aviation Kema Chikwe grounded every BAC One-Eleven in the country. She added that the Nigerian government would no longer register aircraft that had exceeded 22 years old, adding that owners would be given 5 years to phase them out. A thorough review regarding the operation of private airliners in Nigeria would be also conducted.

Investigation
Nigerian authorities opened an investigation on the crash, with Aviation Minister Kema Chikwe instituted a panel to investigate the crash. The Nigerian federal upper legislative chambers  began a public session on the same day of the crash, discussing about the crash as part of the investigation. Managing Director of EAS Airlines, Idris Wada, insisted that the aircraft was still in good condition. He later added that Lloyds Insurance, insurers of the  BAC 1-11-500 aircraft which was involved in the crash, has sent a representative from London to investigate the cause of the crash. According to him, the aircraft involved in the crash was fitted with the engine of a grounded EAS Airlines BAC 1-11 aircraft four days before the crash, which raised questions among the senate. He claimed that the practice was not uncommon among the aviation industry.

Prior to the fatal crash, the aircraft involved in the incident had been grounded on two previous occasions: once in 2001 for eleven days to perform engine maintenance, and again in 2002 for 52 days to address engine problems.

Runway overrun

Several possible explanations for the cause of the runway excursion were discussed. The investigation eventually found that there was no technical defects on the aircraft, meaning that it was airworthy to fly. The weather was clear and, while it was hot at the time of the crash, the air density wouldn't have limited the aircraft's ability to take-off safely since investigators considered that the elevation of the airport had not critically affected the aircraft's performance. The actual take-off weight was also within the margin for a safe take-off.

Mallam Aminu Kano International Airport was equipped with two runways; Runway 06/24 and Runway 05/23. The former was significantly longer than the latter. At the time of the crash, Runway 06/24 was being renovated and as a result airliners were asked to use Runway 05/23 instead. Despite the change, the selected runway was long enough for the crew to conduct a safe take-off from Kano, but somehow the aircraft managed to overrun the runway. There had been no runway excursion incidents prior to the crash of Flight 4226.

Unfortunately, there were no usable flight recorders. The cockpit voice recorder was missing from the crash site. While investigators did manage to recover the flight data recorder, the readout indicated that none of the recordings were from flights in Nigeria. The flight data recorder had never been maintained by EAS Airlines and thus it recorded flights that had been carried out during its operation with previous airliners in Europe. The investigation was effectively hampered by the lack of data from the flight recorders.

According to investigators, the most plausible hypothesis was due to the lackadaisical attitude of the pilots during the take-off roll. This was the first time for both flight crew members to fly to Kano. Apparently, both flight crews had been conditioned with the takeoffs on their previous flights, which took place in airports with longer runways. During the take-off roll, the crew didn't take the shorter runway length into account. The crew were probably busy checking the engine parameters and aircraft instruments until they shifted their attention to the runway outside, which was already too late due to the length. The take-off roll was slow, as per the testimony of the on-duty air traffic controller at the time. The airspeed was between V1 and Vr and the aircraft had taken too much runway distance that it was not possible anymore to take any safe evasive actions. The lack of judgement from both flight crew members caused the aircraft to overrun the runway.

Even though the hypothesis was plausible, investigators could not confirm whether their hypothesis was actually true due to the lack of data from flight recorders. Therefore, the reasons for the runway overrun could not be determined.

Failure to take-off
Due to the limited data, investigators had to rely on eyewitness and survivors accounts. The air traffic controller stated that during the take-off roll the aircraft was moving sluggishly and was not at the usual pace for take-off from Runway 23. Following the runway excursion, the aircraft traveled for approximately  before it finally took off from the ground. But before it managed to completely take off, the landing gear smashed onto a ground depression, which was used as a transformer pit for the approach light. The aircraft was struck with impact forces of up to 3G - 4G, enough to significantly degrade the aircraft's performance to gain speed. The violent impact also created huge amount of dusts. These dusts were eventually ingested by the engines, causing a reduction of thrust.

The engines of the BAC One-Eleven were located at the back of the aircraft. Previous investigations conducted by the AIPB showed that several objects had been propelled into the engines' air intake area by the aircraft's main landing gear due to the dynamic airflow effect on the tires. As the engines acted like a giant vacuum cleaner, there had been cases in which foreign objects were ingested by the engines. In Flight 4226, the dusts that had been propelled by the tires were sucked into the engines. This was proved by the disassembly of the engines, where dusts had been compacted and compressed within the high-pressure section of the turbine, creating a cake formation that had been lodged between the crevices of the compressor casings. The amount of dusts inside the engines resulted in the momentary degradation of the engine's ability to produce thrust. With the degraded performance of the engine, the aircraft could not gain altitude quickly enough.

The aircraft's poor performance on gaining altitude was worsened by the configuration of the aircraft. When it lifted off the ground, the landing gear was still in extended position. The landing gear was normally retracted shortly after the crew had obtained a positive rate of climb. In Flight 4226, the runway overran and the subsequent impact with the ground depression might have caused a lot of stress and shock to the flight crew that they simply did nothing. The landing gear down position would have diminished the aircraft's ability to climb adequately.

Eventually, due to the low altitude of the aircraft, the limited ability to gain altitude and the reduced performance of the aircraft's speed, the aircraft couldn't climb safely from the crowded Gwammaja Quarters.

Other findings
The investigation also revealed problems regarding the operation of EAS Airlines, particularly on the maintenance culture and the oversight system of Nigeria's aviation industry at the time. The review regarding such issue was conducted with assistance from ICAO and members of United Kingdom's Baines-Simmons. The review discovered that the two certifying engineers who worked on the involved aircraft had been working without adequate breaks. There was no indication that the CVR and the FDR had been inspected on a daily basis and some maintenance data were left uncompleted. EAS Airlines also imposed the practice of maintaining their fleet by cannibalizing one unairworthy aircraft.

Despite the findings, investigators stated that there was no evidence that maintenance error had played a role in the crash. However, according to investigators, the findings related to inadequate logbook entries were not uncommon in Nigeria as it used to be the norm for most airliners in the country at the time. The investigation stated that the ruling aviation authority body of Nigeria, NCAA, had not paid enough attention to the country's aviation industry. During an audit on the body, it was revealed that the NCAA had a ramp inspection plan, but it was lacking in details that would have covered every aspects of airworthiness.

Conclusion
The final report attributed the crash to the crew's inability to safely execute the take-off phase within the available runway length. The breakdown of coordination between each flight crew members caused the aircraft to be unable to gain altitude quickly and safely, ultimately caused the aircraft to crash.

The AIPB issued 8 recommendations as a result of the accident, including improvements related to supervision, stricter penalties for malpractices, and improvements related to aircraft flight recorders, in which the NCAA should not register an aircraft under Nigerian registration if an aircraft have not been fitted with a digital flight recorder. The NCAA was also asked to immediately conduct an audit to every BAC One-Eleven in Nigeria to ensure that only operators who have the required spare parts that are allowed to conduct operation within Nigeria, in response to EAS Airlines' cannibalized aircraft practice.

Notes

See also
Viasa Flight 742, another crash in which a small twinjet aircraft (a McDonnell Douglas DC-9) crashed into a crowded city area shortly after takeoff, causing a high number of ground fatalities.

References

External links
 Pictures of the disaster, BBC
 Images of the involved aircraft and the crash site, Bureau of Aircraft Accidents Archives

2002 disasters in Nigeria
Aviation accidents and incidents in Nigeria
Aviation accidents and incidents in 2002
Accidents and incidents involving the BAC One-Eleven
May 2002 events in Nigeria
Airliner accidents and incidents caused by engine failure
Airliner accidents and incidents caused by pilot error
2002 in Nigeria